Thomas Lee Hinzo (born June 18, 1964) is an American former professional baseball second baseman who played for two seasons. He played for the Cleveland Indians of the Major League Baseball (MLB) for 67 games during the 1987 Cleveland Indians season and 18 games during the 1989 Cleveland Indians season.

Hinzo attended the University of Arizona, and in 1984 he played collegiate summer baseball with the Harwich Mariners of the Cape Cod Baseball League. He was selected by the Indians in the 7th round of the 1986 MLB Draft.

References

External links
, or CPBL

1964 births
Living people
American expatriate baseball players in Canada
American expatriate baseball players in Mexico
American expatriate baseball players in Taiwan
Arizona League Mariners players
Arizona Wildcats baseball players
Baseball players from San Diego
Batavia Trojans players
Calgary Cannons players
Cleveland Indians players
Colorado Springs Sky Sox players
Greenville Braves players
Harwich Mariners players
Kinston Indians players
Leones de Yucatán players
Major League Baseball second basemen
Memphis Chicks players
Oklahoma City 89ers players
Omaha Royals players
Potros de Minatitlán players
Richmond Braves players
Rochester Red Wings players
Southwestern Jaguars baseball players
Wei Chuan Dragons players
Williamsport Bills players